Origo (stylised as ORIGO, previously as [origo]) is a major Hungarian-language news website founded in 1998 by telecommunications company MATÁV. In 2018, Origo was the third most visited Hungarian website. Since 2015, Origo has been regularly criticised by the left for its uncritical support of the Fidesz political party.  Multiple critics described the website as "state-run propaganda", prone to operate with the same keywords for emotional mobilization as other news outlets with close ties to Fidesz.

History

1998-2001: Foundation and early days
Four former Magyar Narancs employees, Péter Nádori, Ferenc Pohly, György Simó and Balázs Weyer decided to start an online news website. After contacting other media publishers such as Népszabadság, they were eventually given funds for the website by Magyar Telekom (then called MATÁV) in order to popularise internet subscriptions in Hungary. Preparations for the website began in May 1997, and it was eventually launched a year later, in December 1998. Although Origo only had one real competitor at the time, Index.hu (then called Internetto), its initial readership was underwhelming due to structural issues with the website. However, this soon changed as MATÁV's resources weren't as limited as Internetto's, and they also owned the biggest Hungarian search engine at the time, the Altavista-based AltaVizsla. They also purchased email provider freemail.hu, further boosting their popularity as Origo were now able to offer a complete news + search engine + email package, something Index were unable to do. In 2000, Nádori was replaced by Weyer as Origo's editor-in-chief.

2001-2010: The most popular news site in Hungary
Origo's financial strength meant that they were able to cover the September 11 attacks without any server problems, while Index was constantly struggling with outages. This cemented Origo's position as the most popular news site in Hungary for years to come.

In 2006, Origo's owners, Magyar Telekom (then called T-Online), announced that they were purchasing iWiW, Hungary's largest social media site at the time. This allowed for some level of integration between Origo and iWiW, especially after they transferred iWiW over to Origo. They also purchased blogging service Blogter.hu, a competitor to Index's blog.hu.

In 2009, Origo's frontpage was redesigned.

2010-2015: Pressured by the government
In 2010, former Index employee Miklós Vaszily became Origo's new CEO. Vaszily was tasked with making the company profitable. Several other former Index employees also joined the website around this time. In 2011, editor-in-chief Balázs Weyer left the company, and he was eventually replaced by Index's Albert Gazda. Under his tenure, Origo went through another design change with the help of Péter Uj, Index's co-founder and former editor-in-chief. Gazda was replaced by Gergő Sáling in 2013 after he resigned. Gazda later claimed that he resigned after political figures had started pressuring Origo around that time. According to some, around this time, officials from the Hungarian government initiated meetings with Magyar Telekom executives in order to pressure the company to take a more pro-government stance. 

Sáling did not last long at the company as he was fired in June 2014. Although Origo officially cited the "adapting to the changing ways of media consumption" as the reason of his firing, many were sceptical of this reasoning, citing the lawsuit of Sáling's deputy, András Pethő against Fidesz official János Lázár as the cause of his departure. This was corroborated by accounts from Pethő as well as Sáling's predecessor, Albert Gazda. Sáling's firing also lead to the departure of many other journalists and editors of Origo, including everyone working for the "Origo News" section of the website. The new editor-in-chief after Sáling's departure was Ákos Pálmai.

2015-2018: New Wave Media
In 2015, Magyar Telekom announced that they were selling Origo after their parent company, Deutsche Telekom had started getting rid of its media interests. The eventual buyers were New Wave Media, who also owned vs.hu at the time. After the transaction, Pálmay was replaced by Bence György as the website's editor-in-chief who stayed in his position until September 2017 when he was replaced by László Gábor.

In 2017, it was announced that New Wave Media was purchased by Ádám Matolcsy, the son of György Matolcsy who is the governor of the Hungarian National Bank and a Fidesz member. Although Matolcsy had denied that Origo would be used for the purposes of propaganda, the website began uncritically supporting Viktor Orbán's anti-immigration campaign, as well as regularly publishing fake news targeted against opposition politicians, which also resulted in Origo losing several lawsuits.

2018-now: KESMA 
In 2018, Origo - together with the majority of Fidesz-related media - became the property of a media foundation called KESMA. The newspaper further supports the anti-immigration campaign of the governing parties, in which it has already reported fake news on several occasions, and has also falsified foreign news in order to make a negative statement. Origo has also repeatedly claimed untruth about opposition politicians.

In 2020, the newspaper supported Donald Trump’s campaign, and repeatedly claimed after the election defeat that the election had been rigged, although no evidence of this was available. Many of the allegations made by the newspaper in this regard later proved to be false.

In January 2021, Origo blamed "the presidency of Joe Biden" for the storming of the Capitol, even though he had not even been inaugurated at the time.

During the 2022 Russian invasion of Ukraine , Origo was criticised for spreading Russian propaganda, and pro-Kremlin views.

References 

Hungarian news websites
1990s establishments in Hungary